Taleb Goli (also Romanized as Ţāleb Golī) is a village in Shoja Rural District, in the Central District of Jolfa County, East Azerbaijan Province, Iran. At the 2006 census, its population was 17, in 8 families.

References 

Populated places in Jolfa County